The 1949 La Flèche Wallonne was the 13th edition of La Flèche Wallonne cycle race and was held on 13 April 1949. The race started in Charleroi and finished in Liège. The race was won by Rik Van Steenbergen.

General classification

References

1949 in road cycling
1949
1949 in Belgian sport
La Fleche Wallonne